Fabrizio Mori (born 28 June 1969 in Livorno) is an Italian hurdler, best known for his gold medal at the 1999 World Championships.

Biography
Fabrizio Mori won nineteen medals at the International athletics competitions, five of these with national relays team. He represented in the Golden Gala eight times between 1992 and 2002. His greatest success was in 1999 when he copped the gold medal at the World Championship, beating athletes such as Bryan Bronson, Stephane Diagana and Samuel Matete. In 2010 he was ranked 16th in the world along with Derrick Adkins of the United States with his 47.54 best time This also makes him the third fastest European ever

Mori announced his retirement from professional athletics in 2006 in front of the 2006 Winter Olympics crowd gathered in his homeland, Turin, Italy. His personal best over 400 metres hurdles, which is also an Italian record, is 47.54 seconds, achieved at the 2001 World Championships in Edmonton. He participated at three editions of the Summer Olympics (1992, 1996, 2000), he has 32 caps in national team from 1988 to 2002.

National records
 400 metres hurdles: 47.54 ( Edmonton, 10 August 2001) – current holder

Progression
He finished the season 11 times in world top 25, in 1999 he was World Leader.

Achievements

National titles
He has won 3 times the individual national championship.
3 wins in the 400 metres hurdles (1989, 1991, 1996)

See also
 Italian records in athletics
 Italy national relay team
 Italian all-time top lists – 400 metres hurdles
 FIDAL Hall of Fame

References

External links
 

1969 births
Living people
Italian male hurdlers
Athletes (track and field) at the 1992 Summer Olympics
Athletes (track and field) at the 1996 Summer Olympics
Athletes (track and field) at the 2000 Summer Olympics
Olympic athletes of Italy
Sportspeople from Livorno
Athletics competitors of Fiamme Gialle
World Athletics Championships medalists
European Athletics Championships medalists
Mediterranean Games silver medalists for Italy
Mediterranean Games bronze medalists for Italy
Athletes (track and field) at the 1991 Mediterranean Games
Athletes (track and field) at the 1997 Mediterranean Games
World Athletics Championships athletes for Italy
Mediterranean Games medalists in athletics
World Athletics Championships winners